Miss Ella Fitzgerald & Mr Gordon Jenkins Invite You to Listen and Relax is a collection of material recorded by Ella Fitzgerald between 1949 and 1954, all tracks were arranged by Gordon Jenkins. All tracks were previously only available on 78rpm singles. The album was compiled and released by Decca in 1955.

Track listing
"I Wished on the Moon" (Dorothy Parker, Ralph Rainger) – 3:08
"Baby" (Robert Colby, Floyd Huddleston) – 2:44
"I Hadn't Anyone Till You" (Ray Noble) – 3:02
"A Man Wrote a Song" (Dave Franklin) – 3:11
"Who's Afraid (Not I, Not I, Not I)" (Doris Tauber, Jack Lawrence) – 2:45
"Happy Talk" (Richard Rodgers, Oscar Hammerstein II) – 2:25
"Black Coffee" (Paul Francis Webster, Sonny Burke) – 3:03
"Lover's Gold" (Morty Nevins, Bob Merrill) – 3:04
"I'm Gonna Wash That Man Right Outa My Hair" (Rodgers, Hammerstein) – 2:53
"Dream a Little Longer" (Donald Kahn) – 2:59
"I Need" (Ralph Care, Sol Marcus) – 2:40
"Foolish Tears" (Jenny Lou Carson) – 2:57

Personnel

Performance
Ella Fitzgerald – vocal
Gordon Jenkins – arranger

References

1955 albums
Ella Fitzgerald albums
Albums arranged by Gordon Jenkins
Decca Records albums